Short Kilts is a 1924 American silent comedy film starring Stan Laurel.

Cast
 Stan Laurel - McPherson's son
 James Finlayson - McGregor's son
 Mickey Daniels - McPherson kid
 Ena Gregory - McGregor's daughter
 George Rowe - Blacksmith
 Mary Kornman - McGregor kid
 Leo Willis - McGregor
 Jack Gavin - McPherson
 'Tonnage' Martin Wolfkeil - McHungry's son
 Sammy Brooks - McHungry
 Helen Gilmore - Mrs. McHungry

See also
 List of American films of 1924

External links

1924 films
American silent short films
American black-and-white films
1924 comedy films
1924 short films
Films directed by George Jeske
Silent American comedy films
American comedy short films
1920s American films